Simon Neil Stuart Andrews (14 August 1982 – 19 May 2014) was a British motorcycle racer. He competed in the British Superbike Championship for the MSS Kawasaki aboard a Kawasaki ZX10-R and RAF Reserves team, aboard a Honda CBR1000RR. He died as a result of a crash when racing on a road course in Northern Ireland.

Career

British Supersport Championship
Andrews made his British Supersport debut in 2001, and contested the series full-time in 2002. In 2003 he competed in three different championships – British Supersport, British Superstock and AXO European Superstock, earning five BSS podium finishes. In 2004 he came third in BSS, and took tenth overall in 2005. He started 2006 in Supersport again before moving up to the British Superbike Championship midseason with the Jentin Lloyds British team.

British Superbike Championship
In 2007 Andrews finished 16th overall from the nine rounds he contested.
In 2008 he ran 3rd for a while at Brands Hatch before finishing 9th. He scored two top 10 finishes at Donington Park in 2008, despite qualifying down in 24th. In race 2 at Mallory Park he ran 2nd for several laps on a drying track, but ultimately faded to 7th. He scored 20 top-ten finishes in total, despite being troubled by a knee injury for much of the season

For 2009 he left Jentin to join MSS Colchester Kawasaki. Despite injuring his collarbone pre-season he qualified on the front row for round 3 at Donington Park, and took a 4th-place finish at round 4 at Thruxton. Andrews again impressed at Mallory Park, leading race one before being catapulted out by Josh Brookes in an incident which eliminated seven riders. He was already riding injured at this point, and an operation on his wrist immediately after this round caused him to miss the 3-race meeting at Brands Hatch He took his first career podium at Cadwell Park, finishing 4th on the road but being promoted when on-the-road winner Leon Camier was excluded for ignoring a black and orange flag. In race one at the same venue he touched with team-mate Julien da Costa in race one, finishing fifth ahead of the Frenchman. He was successful at Croft despite using no rider aids. He also contested the World Superbike round at Donington, finishing 10th in race 2 after passing the leading works Kawasaki of Broc Parkes. He finished the year by finishing 7th on his debut in the Macau street race. Andrews re-signed for the MSS Colchester Kawasaki team for 2009 alongside Gary Mason.

Crash and death
Andrews was airlifted to a hospital in Northern Ireland in critical condition after suffering a serious crash while competing in the North West 200 on Saturday, 17 May 2014. He came off his bike at high speed, slid down the asphalt then collided head-first with the kerb-edge of a raised footway in Portrush, County Antrim.

After receiving immediate medical intervention from the race doctors and medics, Andrews was airlifted to the Royal Victoria Hospital in Belfast in a critical condition after suffering the high-speed accident on the approach to Metropole corner. Andrews was competing in the second Superstock race of the event aboard his BMW.

A statement was released on Sunday night (18 May) by race organisers they said: "Simon Andrews' family are at his bedside in the Intensive Care unit of the Royal Victoria Hospital, Belfast, where he remains in a critical condition following his crash in the Superstock race at yesterday's Vauxhall International North West 200."

He died in hospital on 19 May 2014 as a result of his injuries, aged 31.

Career statistics

All time

British Supersport Championship
(key) (races in bold indicate pole position, races in italics indicate fastest lap)

British Superbike Championship
(key) (races in bold indicate pole position, races in italics indicate fastest lap)

1. – E Denotes riders participating in the Evo class within the British Superbike Championship.

Superbike World Championship
(key) (races in bold indicate pole position, races in italics indicate fastest lap)

References

English motorcycle racers
British Supersport Championship riders
British Superbike Championship riders
1982 births
2014 deaths
Isle of Man TT riders
Superbike World Championship riders
FIM Superstock 1000 Cup riders
Motorcycle racers who died while racing
Sport deaths in Northern Ireland
Sportspeople from Worcester, England